Wosera-Gawi District is a district of East Sepik Province in Papua New Guinea. It is one of the six administrative districts that make up the province.

See also
Districts of Papua New Guinea

Districts of Papua New Guinea